Sinner Get Ready (stylized in all caps) is the fourth studio album by American musician Kristin Hayter, under her alias Lingua Ignota. Created in collaboration with producer and engineer Seth Manchester, it is the follow-up to Hayter's 2019 album Caligula. It was released on Sargent House on August 6, 2021, and was met with widespread acclaim from music critics.

Critical reception

Sinner Get Ready received widespread critical acclaim. At Metacritic, which assigns a normalized rating out of 100 to reviews from professional publications, the release received an average score of 83, based on ten reviews, indicating "universal acclaim." Aggregator AnyDecentMusic? gave the album a 8.0 out of 10 score, based on their assessment of the critical consensus.

Accolades

Track listing

Notes
 All tracks are stylized in all caps. For example, "The Order of Spiritual Virgins" is stylized as "THE ORDER OF SPIRITUAL VIRGINS".
 "The Sacred Linament of Judgment" features audio from televangelist Jimmy Swaggart's "I have sinned" speech.

Personnel
Musicians
 Kristin Hayter - vocals (all tracks), piano (tracks 1, 4, 6–9), bowed banjo (1, 6), cello (1, 2, 5), organ (2), bells (2, 3, 6), bowed psaltery (3), mountain dulcimer (3), banjo (5), prepared piano (5, 8)
 Seth Manchester - prepared piano (1, 2, 8); oscillators, extended banjo (1); percussion (tracks 2, 4, 5), shruti box (3, 6); guitar, Moog (3); banjo (5), Moog Grandmother (8)
 Ryan Seaton - instrumental arrangements (all tracks), clarinets (1, 4, 8, 9), saxophones (1, 4, 5, 7–9), melodicas (1–3, 5, 8), castanets (1–3, 8), Tibetan cymbals (1–3), woodwind mouthpieces (1–5, 7, 9); wooden drum with animal skin and single snare, frame drums (1, 4); vocals, Doepfer MS-404, wooden shakers, singing bowl (1); bells (2), cowbell (2, 3), wooden flute (4, 5, 9); pennywhistle, Korg Wavestation (4, 8, 9); trumpet VST, harmonica (4, 9); Moog Voyager (5, 8, 9), saxophone neck (5, 9); mandolins, cello VST (7, 9); FM8 soft synth, Juno 106, Roland TB-303, Wurlitzer, tambourine, electric guitars (8); Eisenberg Vier soft synth (9)
 J. Mamana - banjo (8)

Technical
 Kristin Hayter - production, additional recording
 Seth Manchester - production, mixing, recording
 Ryan Seaton - additional production, additional recording
 Chris Gehringer – mastering

Artwork
 Kristin Hayter - album photography (shooting, editing)
 Alexis S.F. Marshall - album photography assistance
 Ashley Rose Couture - mask
 Chimere Noire - layout design

Charts

References

2021 albums
Sargent House albums
Works for prepared piano